The Fiat Fullback is a pickup truck from the Italian automobile manufacturer Fiat made from 2016 to 2019. The result of a collaboration agreement between Fiat and the Japanese automaker Mitsubishi Motors signed in 2014, the truck is mechanically identical to the fifth generation of the Mitsubishi Triton/L200, from which the engines also originate. It has been assembled since 2016 in Laem Chabang by Mitsubishi Motors Thailand. The only changes from the L200 are the front grille and some interior finishing specifications, as well as customisations by Mopar.

It is sold in the Europe, the Middle East and Africa (EMEA) selling region, and was introduced at the Dubai International Motor Show on November 10, 2015. In some countries, it is badged as the Ram 1200.

The Fullback is only sold in the EMEA markets as Fiat already produces a pickup for the South American market which is not exported elsewhere, the Fiat Toro, which is similar in size to the Fullback but based on the monocoque chassis of the Jeep Renegade.

Like most of its competitors, the Fullback offers four configurations (single cab, extended cab, double cab, and cab chassis), and three trim levels. All versions have the same height (1780 mm), width (1815 mm) and wheelbase (3000 mm); the length varies depending on the configuration: 5155 mm for the single cab, 5275 mm for the extended cab and 5285 mm for the double cab.

Specifications 

* * Information in brackets for automatic version

References

External links 

 Official Website

All-wheel-drive vehicles
Cars introduced in 2016
Pickup trucks
Rear-wheel-drive vehicles
Off-road vehicles
Fullback